Jeane Porter Hester (born June 15, 1929) is a physician known for her work in cancer research and therapy. She was a Professor of Medicine, Chief of Supportive Therapy, and Chief of Leukapheresis at University of Texas MD Anderson Cancer Center in Houston, Texas, and was one of the developers of IBM 2997, the computerized blood cell separator. She was inducted into the Texas Women's Hall of Fame in 1984 and the Oklahoma Hall of Fame in 1987.

Early life
She was born Jeane Porter on June 15, 1929 in Big Spring, Texas. She grew up in Chickasha, Oklahoma. After graduating from Chickasha High School, she attended Oklahoma College for Women in Chickasha, where she majored in French and minored in history and philosophy.

Medical career
After graduating, she worked for a medical doctor in Chickasha and then as a secretary for an ophthalmologist in Oklahoma City, Dr. Welborn Sanger. Sanger, recognizing her potential talent in the medical field, promoted her to surgical assistant. Sanger encouraged her to complete a medical degree, so she studied in the pre-medical program at Oklahoma City University, graduating in 1963. She was admitted to the University of Oklahoma College of Medicine, from which she graduated in 1967. In 1971, she completed a residency in hematology and oncology, and from 1971 to 1973, she was a fellow in oncology at the University of Texas MD Anderson Cancer Center. Hester then became an assistant professor at MD Anderson, where she worked in cancer hematology research. She rose to the rank of professor and became Chief of Supportive Therapy and Chief of Leukapheresis service. Through the National Heart, Lung, and Blood Institute she worked as an exchange scientist to the Soviet Union.

She was one of the developers of IBM 2997, the computerized blood cell separator. The separator is "used in diagnosing red and white blood cells and platelets and the enhancement of cells to combat tumors."

Hester served on the editorial boards of the Journal of Clinical Apheresis, the Journal of the American Medical Association, and Plasma Therapy and Transfusion Technology. She has contributed to over 25 books and over 125 other writings.

Awards
Hester is a member of the Oklahoma College for Women Hall of Fame, the Texas Women's Hall of Fame, and the Oklahoma Hall of Fame. She is a recipient of the Cohn de Laval Award for great scientific contributions to apheresis.

Family
She married Bob Hester in 1951, and their son Stephen was born in 1953.

References 

1929 births
Living people
People from Chickasha, Oklahoma
People from Big Spring, Texas
University of Science and Arts of Oklahoma alumni
Oklahoma City University alumni
University of Oklahoma alumni
20th-century women scientists
American oncologists
Women oncologists
University of Texas MD Anderson Cancer Center faculty
Cancer researchers